Virginie Caulier is a Belgian equestrian. At the 2012 Summer Olympics she competed in the Individual eventing.

References

Belgian female equestrians

Living people
Olympic equestrians of Belgium
Equestrians at the 2012 Summer Olympics
Year of birth missing (living people)
21st-century Belgian women